Drums Unlimited is an album by American jazz drummer Max Roach recorded in 1965 and 1966 and released on the Atlantic label.

Reception

Allmusic awarded the album 4 stars and its review by Scott Yanow states, "essentially advanced hard-bop with a generous amount of space taken up by Roach's drum solos... because of the melodic and logically-planned nature of his improvisations, they continually hold on to one's attention".

Track listing
All compositions by Max Roach except as indicated
 "The Drum Also Waltzes" - 3:34     
 "Nommo" (Jymie Merritt) - 12:43     
 "Drums Unlimited" - 4:23     
 "St. Louis Blues" (W.C. Handy) - 5:22     
 "For Big Sid" - 3:04     
 "In the Red (A Christmas Carol)" - 12:21  
Recorded in New York on October 14, 1965 (tracks 1 & 4), October 20, 1965 (tracks 2 & 6) and April 25, 1966 (tracks 3 & 5)

Personnel 
Max Roach - drums
Freddie Hubbard - trumpet (tracks 2, 4, & 6)
Roland Alexander - soprano saxophone (track 4)
James Spaulding - alto saxophone (tracks 2, 4 & 6)
Ronnie Mathews - piano (tracks 2, 4 & 6)
Jymie Merritt  - bass (tracks 2, 4 & 6)

References 

1966 albums
Max Roach albums
Atlantic Records albums
Albums produced by Arif Mardin